Stictoptera cucullioides is a moth of the family Noctuidae. It is found from the Indo-Australian tropics of India, Sri Lanka to the Bismarck Islands and Queensland. It is an introduced species in Hawaii, where it is found on Oahu, Molokai, Maui and Hawaii.

Description
In the male, the head and thorax are greyish brown. Abdomen fuscous. Forewings greyish brown with numerous indistinct waved lines. Orbicular and reniform stigmata indistinct, where the latter with a few raised scaled on it. A series of small marginal lunules can be seen. Hindwings opalescent hyaline (glass like), where the veins and broad outer band are fuscous with pale colored cilia.

Ecology
Larvae have been recorded on Mesua and Calophyllum species (including Calophyllum inophyllum) and have been reared on Garcinia species. Other recorded food plants include Clusia rosea, Garcinia cambogia and Mammea americana.

References

External links

Stictopterinae
Moths of Japan